This is the results breakdown of the local elections held in Castilla–La Mancha on 27 May 2007. The following tables show detailed results in the autonomous community's most populous municipalities, sorted alphabetically.

Overall

City control
The following table lists party control in the most populous municipalities, including provincial capitals (shown in bold). Gains for a party are displayed with the cell's background shaded in that party's colour.

Municipalities

Albacete
Population: 161,508

Ciudad Real
Population: 70,124

Cuenca
Population: 51,205

Guadalajara
Population: 75,493

Talavera de la Reina
Population: 83,793

Toledo
Population: 77,601

See also
2007 Castilian-Manchegan regional election

References

Castilla-La Mancha
2007